Pseudomonas perolens is a Gram-negative, non-sporulating, motile, rod bacterium that is known to cause mustiness in eggs in Poland. The type strain is ATCC 10757.

References

Pseudomonadales